The Lhalu family is a Tibetan noble family who are known in Tibet for producing the 8th Dalai Lama.

See also 

 Patrick French, Tibet, Tibet, une histoire personnelle d'un pays perdu, translated from English by William Oliver Desmond, Albin Michel, 2005

References

External links 

Tibetan families
Dalai Lamas